Primarily, students of the Tucson area attend public schools in the Tucson Unified School District (TUSD). TUSD has the second highest enrollment of any school district in Arizona, behind Mesa Unified School District in the Phoenix metropolitan area. There are also many publicly funded charter schools with a specialized curriculum.

Public schools

Charter schools

Tucson is home to many taxpayer-supported public charter schools. Admission to these schools is determined by the school's open enrollment policy, subject to the criteria determined by Arizona statute, summarized by the Arizona State Board for Charter Schools.

Academy of Math and Science, national Blue Ribbon elementary, middle and high school
The Academy of Tucson (elementary, middle, and high school) provides an environment that includes all the elements needed for an excellent education: small, safe campuses and classes, a rigorous yet realistic curriculum, highly qualified teachers, friendly classmates, and varied social and athletic activities.
AmeriSchools Academy, elementary, middle school,
BASIS Charter School, a nationally ranked high school.
Compass High School, specializing in vocational and arts training.
Hermosa Montessori School, a nationally ranked, excelling school since 2003.
La Paloma Academy, an independent, non-profit school that encourages students to learn the 6 pillars of character.
Legacy Traditional Schools, traditional education focus K-8 charter school network since 2007
Leman Academy of Excellence, an award winning tuition-free classical charter school founded by Dr. Kevin Leman.
Math and Science Success Academy, elementary school, sister school of the Academy of Math and Science
Presidio School Tucson, a national Blue Ribbon elementary, middle and high school
Rose Academies Public Charter High Schools (Canyon Rose Academy, Canyon Rose Academy East, Desert Rose Academy Charter School, Mountain Rose Academy, & Pima Rose Academy) have been a Tucson High School for over 15 years, and provides an alternative education setting in order to meet the unique demands of their students.
Satori Charter School, an excelling school since 2005.
Sky Islands Public High School,] offering an integrated curriculum with a focus on ecosystems
Sonoran Science Academy, a nationally ranked college prep high school and an excelling school since 2003.
Southern Arizona Community Academy, an accelerated, self-paced high school.

Private schools
Tucson has several private schools:
Desert Christian Schools (Arizona), a faith-based, for grades K–12.
Fenster School, a boarding and day school
Green Fields Country Day School, Southern Arizona's oldest independent school
International School of Tucson, Independent school with an accelerated learning program and bi-lingual education for preschool through 5th grade,  near the University of Arizona Campus.
Kino Learning Center, a school that serves grades K–12 and follows the Progressive Education philosophies of A. S. Neill. has a schedule policy that allows students, to some extent, to choose their own classes. kino also has an animal center that, to this day, houses 3 sheep, a goat, and some number of chickens, there are also some animals inside. 
Our Mother of Sorrows Catholic School Our Mothers of Sorrows School is a kindergarten through eighth grade Catholic school, located on Tucson's east side of town, located on South Kolb road between 22nd Street and Golf Links Road. OMOSS teaches the common core with an emphasis on the Catholic religion. OMOSS as its referred offers various after school activities depending on the season, from violin to school sports, which are commonly held at Sal Pointe Catholic High School against other schools in the parish and state. OMOSS'S current principle is Mr. Keller who is leaving after the 2015- 2016 school year for a position at Saint Augustine High School, Vice Principal Vue is scheduled to take over with an outside search for a new vice principal.
Pusch Ridge Christian Academy, a faith-based, school for grades 6–12.
Salpointe Catholic High School
San Miguel High School, College and Career preparatory high school located in the Roman Catholic Diocese of Tucson.
Saint Augustine Catholic High School. Catholic High School for grades 9-12
St.Cyril School of Alexandria, for grades K–8
The Gregory School
St. Michael's Parish Day School, which is highly regarded as one of the most economically advantaged schools in the valley.
Tucson Hebrew Academy, which has been awarded Blue Ribbon School of Excellence status.
Tucson Waldorf School.

References